This is the discography of American-French-Spanish disco group Santa Esmeralda.

Albums

Studio albums

Compilation albums

Singles

References

Discographies of American artists
Discographies of French artists
Discographies of Spanish artists